Gerolamo Bortotti (Belluno, c. 1857 – Venice, 1925) was an Italian sculptor.

Biography
He was born in Belluno, and with a three-year stipend from his native city, he was able to attend the Accademia di Belle Arti of Venice. He was noted as a wood carver, a skill he had learned in his native city, which had also produced the carver and sculptor, Andrea Brustolon, and the contemporary rival of Bortotti, Valentino Panciera Besarel.

Bortotti was sought after for his carved frames, caskets, and other woodwork. Some of his frames were themselves displayed and awarded at expositions. For many years, Bortotti was mainly dedicated to sculpture, and the 1881 exhibition of Fine Arts in Milan he displayed: The Rape (ratto) of the Venetian Brides. He also made ceramic sculpture including: Modesty and A Fisherman of Chioggia.

He worked mainly in Venice. Among his portrait work are a bust of Giuseppe Verdi at the Giardini, the portrait of Jacopo Castelli on the headstones to the Venetian patriots at Bocca di Piazza, and the bust of Pope Pius X (1907) placed on the landing of the Scalone at the Scuola di San Rocco.

References

1857 births
1925 deaths
People from Belluno
20th-century Italian sculptors
20th-century Italian male artists
19th-century Italian male artists
19th-century Italian sculptors
Italian male sculptors
Accademia di Belle Arti di Venezia alumni